Eulalie de Mandéville also known as Cécée Macarty (1774–1848) was an American placée and businesswoman. She has been called the 'most successful free mulatto businesswoman' in the Antebellum South.

She was the daughter of count Pierre Enguerrand Philippe, Écuyer de Mandéville, Sieur de Marigny, and his slave concubine, and the half-sister of Bernard de Marigny.  She was manumitted by her father, who arranged a plaçage between her and Eugène de Macarty. The couple had five children.

Eulalie de Mandéville was an accomplished and successful businesswoman. From about 1795 onward, she established an import business, importing manufactured goods which she stored in New Orleans and then distributed to retail outlets through a network of slaves as far away as to Attakapas.  This was very lucrative, and she invested her money in stocks, real estate and discounted banknotes, accumulating a fortune. She was also active as a banker. 

In 1830, she owned a fortune worth $155,000.229, including 32 slaves.   She was listed among the wealthiest black entrepreneurs in the United States between 1820 and 1865.   She was the owner of 32 slaves, and as such she was the largest slaveholder among the free people of color in New Orleans; she was however far below the Black slave owning planters outside of the city borders, among whom were notably the sugar planters Ricaud, mother Madame Cyprian Ricard and son Pierre Ricard, who in 1860 owned 152 slaves and an estate worth $221,500. 

She married Eugène de Macarty shortly before his death in 1845.  When he died, she inherited a fortune of $12,000. The relatives of her late husband questioned his will, among them being Delphine LaLaurie, claiming that it was illegal for a white man to will more than ten percent of his assets to a coloured mistress. They further more questioned whether the personal fortune of Eulalie de Mandéville (at that time worth $3 million) should in fact be classified as part of the property of Eugene Macarty, because it was known that he had transferred much of his property to her prior to his death, thereby withholding their rightful inheritance.
However, the court acknowledged the will as legal and pointed out that Eulalie de Mandéville was in fact very rich even before she became the heir of her spouse, because of a business activity going back half a century.

References 

1774 births
1848 deaths
People of Colonial Spanish Louisiana
19th-century American businesspeople
19th-century American businesswomen
American slave owners
Black slave owners in the United States
American women bankers
American women slave owners
African-American Catholics
19th-century African-American women